Alert Bay Airport  is a public airport located on Cormorant Island next to the village of Alert Bay, British Columbia, Canada. Cormorant Island lies between Malcolm Island and Port McNeill on northeastern Vancouver Island.

Alert Bay Airport was opened in honour of longtime physician and surgeon and one-time mayor Dr. Harold Jackson Pickup (died February 11, 1996).

See also
Alert Bay Water Aerodrome

References

External links
Page about this airport on COPA's Places to Fly airport directory

Registered aerodromes in British Columbia
Regional District of Mount Waddington